Reza Faraji-Dana (born 1960 in Qom) is a reformist Iranian politician and the former minister of Science, Research and Technology under President Hassan Rouhani. He served as president of University of Tehran, and as the former president of the Iranian branch of the Institute of Electrical and Electronics Engineers.

Biography
Reza Farji-Dana was born in 1960 in Qom and received his math diploma from Hakim Nezami high school in 1978. In the same year, he obtained an admission from the Shiraz University in electrical engineering.

He studied electrical engineering at the University of Tehran, and at the University of Waterloo in Ontario, Canada. He graduated with a Ph.D. degree from the University of Waterloo in 1993. He is currently the professor of electrical engineering at the University of Tehran.

Dismissal
Iranian parliament dismissed him as Minister of Science on 20 August 2014. The conservative MPs accused him of permitting students involved in 2009–10 Iranian election protests to continue their education in public universities. He was also accused of appointing senior department heads from people who were involved in mass protests of 2009. Some of the PMs who voted for the dismissal of Farajidana were allegedly benefiting from unlawful scholarships in previous government and the list of those who granted unlawful scholarships has been revealed during the ministration of Farajidana. He was removed from office through impeachment in August 2014.

References

Government ministers of Iran
University of Waterloo alumni
1960 births
Living people
Presidential advisers of Iran
Impeached Iranian officials removed from office
Islamic Revolutionary Guard Corps personnel of the Iran–Iraq War
Iranian electrical engineers
Iranian engineers
Ministers of science of Iran
People from Qom
Microwave engineers
Academic staff of the University of Tehran